Pseudostifftia is a genus of flowering plants in the Moquinia tribe within the daisy family.

Species
The only known species is Pseudostifftia kingii, native to eastern Brazil (State of Bahia)

References

Monotypic Asteraceae genera
Endemic flora of Brazil
Vernonioideae